"Breaking My Heart" is a song by Faroese singer and social media influencer Reiley, released on 19 January 2023. The song is set to represent Denmark in the Eurovision Song Contest 2023 after winning  2023, the Danish national selection for that year's Eurovision Song Contest.

Background 
The song was written and composed by Rani Petersen with Norwegian Bård Mathias Bonsaksen, Sivert Hjeltnes Hagtvet and Swedish Hilda Stenmalm. 

According to Reiley, the song was written during a "toxic" romantic relationship that Reiley had faced. In an interview with the Eurovision YouTube fan channel Eurovision Fantasia, Reiley reported that he knew that the person was not good for them, but had still wanted to keep coming back to them regardless. Reiley had put the song in a folder, and decided to make it into a song when he had heard of  2023.

Eurovision Song Contest

2023 
The event was held on 11 February 2023.

The final took place over two rounds of voting. In the first round of voting, the top three will advance to the superfinal based on the votes of a public vote. In the second round, the top three entries will perform again and the winner will be determined by a 50/50 combination of jury and public vote. Heading into the final, "Breaking My Heart" was considered one of the favorites to win the competition, coming in second on a poll from Eurovision fan-site Wiwibloggs. At the end of the superfinal voting, it was revealed that "Breaking My Heart" had won the superfinal, earning 28% of the vote from juries and 15% of the vote from the Danish public for a combined percentage of 43%, winning by a margin of 11%, thus earning the Danish spot for the Eurovision Song Contest 2023.

At Eurovision 
According to Eurovision rules, all nations with the exceptions of the host country and the "Big Five" (France, Germany, Italy, Spain and the United Kingdom) are required to qualify from one of two semi-finals in order to compete for the final; the top ten countries from each semi-final progress to the final. The European Broadcasting Union (EBU) split up the competing countries into six different pots based on voting patterns from previous contests, with countries with favourable voting histories put into the same pot. On 31 January 2023, an allocation draw was held which placed each country into one of the two semi-finals, as well as which half of the show they would perform in. Denmark has been placed into the second semi-final, to be held on 11 May 2023, and has been scheduled to perform in the first half of the show.

Charts

References 

2023 songs
2023 singles
Atlantic Records singles
Eurovision songs of 2023
Eurovision songs of Denmark